Mihotići is a village in Croatia within the municipality of Matulji. It is located in the Primorje-Gorski Kotar County.

Sources
  Savezni zavod za statistiku i evidenciju FNRJ i SFRJ, popis stanovništva 1948, 1953, 1961, 1971, 1981. i 1991. godine.
 Knjiga: "Narodnosni i vjerski sastav stanovništva Hrvatske, 1880-1991: po naseljima, autor: Jakov Gelo, izdavač: Državni zavod za statistiku Republike Hrvatske, 1998., 

Populated places in Primorje-Gorski Kotar County